Arge melanochroa is a species of the family Argidae, subfamily Arginae.

Description 
The head, the antennae and the thorax are black, while the abdomen is reddish orange. Femurs are black and tibiae are yellow.

This species is very similar to Arge cyanocrocea, but in A. melanochroa the front wings have just a dark spot in proximity of the stigma, while the distal half (the apex) of the wings is transparent. This sawfly can also be confused with Athalia rosae (Tenthredinidae), but in Arge melanochroa the antennae are composed of three sections, the third of which is greatly elongated, while in Athalia rosae the antennae are composed of 10–11 items.

Distribution 
This sawfly is present in Europe.

Ecology 
Adult feed on nectar and pollen of Apiaceae (mainly Heracleum sphondylium and Laserpitium latifolium), while larvae feed on Crataegus species.

References

 Biolib
 Fauna Europaea

Argidae
Insects described in 1790
Taxa named by Johann Friedrich Gmelin